The Lahore Gymkhana Club is a sports club founded in 1878 in Lahore, Pakistan. It offers sports facilities, including golf, swimming, cricket, squash, tennis, billiards, and a gymnasium, and organizes family concerts, lectures, and seminars for its members.

It is the second oldest cricket ground in the South Asian subcontinent.

After Pakistani independence, the management of the club was taken over by native residents. It is presently managed to run  by an elected twelve members executive committee.

References 

Sports venues in Lahore
Squash venues
Swimming venues in Pakistan
Sports clubs in Pakistan
The Mall, Lahore
1878 establishments in British India
Cricket grounds in Pakistan
Sports clubs established in 1878